Giovanni Palamara (29 October 1938 – 4 March 2017) was an Italian politician, lawyer and member of the Italian Socialist Party (PSI). He served as the Mayor of Reggio Calabria, the largest city in the region of Calabria, from 1984 to 1985. He also served as a member and Vice President of the Regional Council of Calabria.

Palamara died on 4 March 2017, at the age of 78.

References

1938 births
2017 deaths
Mayors of Reggio Calabria
Members of the Regional Council of Calabria
Italian Socialist Party politicians